is a 2011 Japanese horror film directed by Jirō Nagae, starring Mariya Suzuki and involving the game of Kokkuri.

Cast
 Mariya Suzuki as Eri
 Asuka Kataoka
 Shizuka Umemoto

See also
Kokkuri-san Movie - Shin Toshi Densetsu -

References

External links
  

Japanese horror films
2011 horror films
Films directed by Jirō Nagae
2011 films
2010s Japanese films